Masłów  (officially Masłów Pierwszy, Masłów I) is a village in Kielce County, Świętokrzyskie Voivodeship, in south-central Poland. It is the seat of the gmina (administrative district) called Gmina Masłów. The local church contains a monumental Altar of Transfiguration of Jesus and also Stations of the Cross designed by Józef Gosławski.

There is also a sport airfield Kielce-Masłów Airport.

The village has a population of 1,528.

See also
 Masłów Drugi

References

Villages in Kielce County
Kielce Governorate
Kielce Voivodeship (1919–1939)